Events in the year 2022 in Uruguay.

Incumbents
 President: Luis Lacalle Pou 
 Vice President: Beatriz Argimón

Events 

17 January - Flood in Montevideo.
2 March – Uruguay voted on a United Nations resolution condemning Russia for its invasion of Ukraine.
27 March - The 2022 Uruguayan Law of Urgent Consideration referendum was held.

Sport 
Association football
 2022 Uruguayan Primera División season
 2022 Uruguayan Segunda División season
 2022 Supercopa Uruguaya
 2022 South American U-17 Women's Championship
 2022 Campeonato Uruguayo Femenino C season

References 

 
Uruguay
Uruguay
2020s in Uruguay
Years of the 21st century in Uruguay